Tilt, also known as Tilt Studio or Tilt Arcade, is a chain of video arcades once found inside various shopping malls across the United States. Tilt is owned by Nickels and Dimes Incorporated (NDI), founded in Carrollton, Texas and currently headquartered in Celina, Texas.

The first Tilt game room was in the Six Flags Mall in 1972. It was founded by Craig Singer. At its peak, the chain had roughly 200 locations from Hawaii to New York, and two in New South Wales, Australia (Manly Fun Pier at Manly Wharf, and Westfield Miranda in Sydney). The original Tilt arcades remain in decline; while there were still 30 Tilt locations in 2016, at the end of 2019, just "over 15" remained open. As of February, 2021, only 5 Tilt locations remain. NDI also operates Tilt Studio family entertainment complexes, which include more arcade games plus food service and major attractions.

References

External links
Tilt Studio official website

Amusement arcades